Top of the Pops 2 (also known as TOTP2) is a British television music show broadcast on BBC Two showing archive footage from the long-running Top of the Pops show, some dating back to the 1960s when the programme first aired on British television, as well as other surviving BBC programmes.

Format
From its debut in 1994, the show was narrated by Johnnie Walker. Steve Wright took over presenter duties in 1997, and hosted the show until being replaced by Mark Radcliffe in December 2009. To date, the presenter has never appeared in-vision, but provides voice-over commentary that introduces each performance.

Originally, the show format consisted of archival footage apart from the last performance, which was usually a more recent performance or an exclusive performance recorded in the main Top of the Pops studio for TOTP2. Between 1994 and 1996 the 'Top 10' singles chart and the number one single of the week would be shown.

For a period of time, the BBC ran a daily version of TOTP2 in which celebrities chose their favourite archive performances. These celebrities, typically comedians, have included Vic Reeves & Bob Mortimer, Phill Jupitus and Jack Dee. There has also been a number of TOTP2 specials, where a "greatest hits" show dedicated to one musician or band has aired. Examples include the Bee Gees, Elvis Presley, Shania Twain and Dionne Warwick specials which aired between 1997–2003.

Since its debut, TOTP2 has also broadcast regular specials for certain theme nights or calendar events. Examples include Christmas and New Years Eve specials.

Rest
In 2004, the controller of BBC Two, Roly Keating, announced that the programme was to be "rested". The move was part of a format change for the main Top of the Pops programme, which saw it being moved from its BBC One Friday night primetime slot to a new slot on Sunday nights on BBC Two. The new format merged the Top of the Pops format of new chart performances with the TOTP2 format of archival footage. This format ran until Top of the Pops cancellation in July 2006. The last showing of TOTP2 before it was rested was the TOTP2 Christmas Special shown on 24 December 2005 on BBC Two.

Repeats of edited episodes of TOTP2 have been shown on a number of UKTV channels from 2004 onwards, including Dave, and Yesterday.

After Top of the Pops
After the cancellation of Top of the Pops, TOTP2 returned to BBC Two on 30 September 2006. The new show format was similar to the earlier TOTP2, but also included live/original BBC performances. These episodes were produced and broadcast in the 4:3 aspect ratio like the majority of its archive material, except for the first two episodes, which were shown in the 16:9 aspect ratio to accommodate new performances. The first 50-minute special included Nelly Furtado, Jamelia and Razorlight, before it reverted to a 30-minute weekly format at 20:00.

The BBC planned to replace the main Top of the Pops special on Christmas Day 2008 with a special edition of TOTP2, that would have included some live performances and archive footage as well as the 2008 Christmas number one UK single; these plans were later scrapped due to complaints by viewers. This led to Simon Cowell asking the BBC to buy the rights to the Top of the Pops brand so he could produce a version of it for ITV1. The BBC later refused Cowell's offer and announced that they would show TOTP on Christmas Day on BBC One as well as the TOTP2 specials on BBC Two.

Final episodes
Since 2008, new sporadic TOTP2 specials have aired, most notably Christmas specials, alongside repeats of episodes originally broadcast between 1997 and 2012.

On 27 June 2009, TOTP2 returned unexpectedly to celebrate the life of Michael Jackson, who had died two days earlier. This later turned out to be the last episode to be narrated by Steve Wright.

In December 2009, Mark Radcliffe took over as presenter of TOTP2. On 10 May 2010, a TOTP2 80s Special aired on BBC Two. This marked the 500th edition of TOTP2.

December 2013 saw the introduction of a new Top of the Pops logo, and a presentation refresh for TOTP2. It also saw the return of "Whole Lotta Love" as the shows theme tune, this variant being a mix of the original and the 1998 remix version.

In recent years, BBC Four has aired vintage editions of Top of the Pops – originally 35 years to the week of the original broadcast, starting with 1977 repeats shown in 2012 – with the renewed interest in the original shows earning ratings of up to a million viewers, prompting the channel to repeat editions of TOTP2, such as in the aftermath of the Christmas Day 2016 death of George Michael. In addition, various performances from TOTP and other programmes have been repackaged as music specials by the TOTP2 team, such as "Disco at the BBC", "Country at the BBC" and "Abba at the BBC". Music documentaries fronted by the likes of Nile Rodgers and Gregory Porter have also featured alongside, under the slogan "Friday night is Music Night".

In tandem with their launch of whole-episode TOTP reruns, BBC Four launched a new clip-show format, Top of the Pops: Big Hits. The first programme covered the period from 1964 to 1975 (the era prior to the full-show reruns starting in 1976) and subsequent editions have compiled a selection of music from each year. Similarly to TOTP2, the Big Hits programmes provide additional information over each performance in the form of onscreen captions; however, Big Hits does not have a voiceover. A Christmas show in the Big Hits format, Top of the Pops: Christmas Hits aired on BBC Four in 2016, with no Christmas TOTP2 running that year.

The 2017 Christmas show was the last episode of TOTP2 to be produced and broadcast, though past episodes are still repeated on BBC Two and BBC Four.

Controversies

In September 2014, the BBC accidentally transmitted an episode containing footage of disgraced presenter Jimmy Savile, posthumously revealed to be a prolific sexual abuser which resulted in seven viewer complaints and a statement of apology by the BBC. The offending footage was subsequently removed from BBC iPlayer. The repeat run of Top of the Pops on BBC Four was already omitting episodes featuring Savile and Dave Lee Travis (due to a suspended sentence), while Jonathan King's reviews of the American charts were edited out of the repeats, due to his conviction. Additionally, performances by Gary Glitter are also no longer shown following the singers conviction for downloading child pornography.

Presentation
The original opening sequence, used between 1994 and 1998 used a 'rewind' theme to represent the show's rewound content. Paula Williams devised the concept by filming abstract objects in a studio on 16mm film with bold 'pop' colours. The sequence was edited and composited at Red Post Production on Flame. The presentation style of TOTP2 in 1994 was actually ahead of parent show, Top of the Pops, which didn't get a similar presentation update until 1995.

Since 1998, the presentation of TOTP2 has generally followed the style of parent show, Top of the Pops. TOTP2 used modified versions of the 1998–2002 and 2002–2003 titles during those eras of the show. However, between 2003 and 2005, an original title sequence based around the 2003 Top of the Pops spiral logo was used alongside the original version of "Whole Lotta Love" by CCS.

Episode guide
This is a guide to show a list of new episodes not in a particular series of TOTP2, broadcast since December 2008.

References

External links 

1994 British television series debuts
2017 British television series endings
1990s British music television series
2000s British music television series
2010s British music television series
BBC Television shows
Pop music television series
Top of the Pops
English-language television shows
British television spin-offs